Altgermanische Wisentjagd, or Altgermanische Büffeljagd, is an outdoor sculpture by Fritz Schaper, installed along Fasanerieallee in the Tiergarten, Berlin, Germany.

References

External links

 

Bison in art
Outdoor sculptures in Berlin
Statues in Germany
Tiergarten (park)